S.R. Lavin (Sholom Lavin) is a poet who was born in Springfield, Massachusetts on April 2, 1945. Lavin's work has been published in the U.S., England, Poland, China, The Netherlands, Japan and Israel.

Work
He is the author of Let Myself Shine (the Kulchur Foundation, 1979) and Voice in the Whirlwind (Dorrance Publishing, 2012). The Four Zoas: A Journal of Poetry & Letters was founded by Lavin (Ware, Mass.) and published work by other poets, including Gerard Malanga and George Oppen. Correspondence between S.R. Lavin and George Oppen is detailed in the publication The Selected Letters of George Oppen by Rachel Blau DuPlessis.

References

American male poets
People from Springfield, Massachusetts
Living people
1945 births